Pandit Thakur Das Bhargava was an Indian politician. He was a Member of Parliament, representing Hisar, Haryana in the Lok Sabha the lower house of India's Parliament as a member of the Indian National Congress. He was also a member of the Constituent Assembly of India. He was a student of Forman Christian College, Lahore and Presidency College, Calcutta.

References

External links
Official biographical sketch in Parliament of India website

1886 births
1962 deaths
Indian National Congress politicians
Lok Sabha members from Haryana
India MPs 1952–1957
India MPs 1957–1962
Members of the Constituent Assembly of India